Thom Kallor is a character appearing in comic books published by DC Comics, primarily as a member of the Legion of Super-Heroes. The character has also been known as Star Boy and Starman.

Publication history
Thom Kallor first appeared in Adventure Comics #282 and was created by Otto Binder and George Papp.

Fictional character biography

Legion of Super-Heroes

Star Boy is a member of the Legion of Super-Heroes, a group of young heroes living a millennium in the future. He was born to astronomer parents on an observation satellite orbiting the planet Xanthu, and is able to temporarily increase the mass of an object, up to the mass of a star. Although he temporarily acquires Kryptonian-level powers similar to those of Superboy when he was caught in the tail of a comet, these eventually fade, leaving only his original density-increasing power. Early in his Legion career, he travels to the 20th century to meet Superboy. While he is there, Lana Lang threatens to expose his identity (a secret on Xanthu) if he refuses to pretend to be her boyfriend, to make Superboy jealous. However, the Boy of Steel overhears her and her plan fails.

Star Boy is expelled from the Legion for killing his girlfriend Dream Girl's ex-boyfriend Kenz Nuhor in self-defense, in violation of the Legion's rule against killing. After this, he and Dream Girl join the Legion of Substitute Heroes before returning to the Legion. Although Star Boy originally wears a purple uniform with a white cape and five-pointed yellow star on his chest, his best-known costume is a full-body starfield suit with white gloves and boots.

After Zero Hour
After the events of Zero Hour and the death of Kid Quantum, Xanthu's original representative to the Legion, Star Boy joins the Legion. He does not get along with Leviathan, partly because Leviathan blames himself for Kid Quantum's death and sees his replacement as a reminder of his failure as a leader.

In addition to his mass-increasing powers, Star Boy temporarily acquires several Kryptonian-like powers and the ability to breathe fire after spaceship accidents. He finds these abilities difficult to control.

When Xanthu leaves the United Planets, Star Boy and fellow Xanthian Legionnaires Kid Quantum and Monstress spread the word that the government of their home planet has been deceived and are astonished at the decision to remain with the Affiliated Planets.

Starman, volume two
In a Starman storyline, the post-Zero Hour Thom Kallor discovers that he is destined to travel back to the 21st century, assume the mantle of Starman (as Danny Blaine) and lose his life. The Danny Blaine version of Thom Kallor was inspired by the Kingdom Come character, designed by Alex Ross.

Legion's 2005 reboot

Although Star Boy was originally depicted as a white Xanthian, Mark Waid's 2005 Legion reboot recasts the character as black (making him the third black hero from Xanthu to join the Legion, after the first and second Kid Quantum). He is described as Cosmic Boy's right-hand man, and remains loyal to him during the Legion until his disappearance at the end of the Dominators storyline. This version of Star Boy (and his version of the Legion) inhabits Earth-Prime, the home of hero-turned-villain Superboy-Prime.

2006
The Starman in Justice Society of America volume three is a Thom Kallor similar to his pre-Crisis incarnation rather than the Star Boy who had recently appeared in Legion of Super-Heroes volume five, raising the question of co-existent timelines. He traveled from his future to the Kingdom Come universe (re-created as Earth-22 at the end of 52), and then to the present. Kallor claims to hear voices in his head, and has been diagnosed as borderline schizophrenic. When he is not a superhero, he is a voluntary patient at the Sunshine Sanitarium. His schizophrenia began soon after he acquired his abilities, and is managed with 31st-century technology; however, present-day medication (which Dream Girl views as barbaric) fails to check his illness. In the sanitarium he assumes the identity of Danny Blaine, his favorite pulp hero on Xanthu. The god-like Gog soon restores Thom's sanity, which Thom believes is not good. Starman leaves the sanitarium and works as a gravedigger, which he believes will help him carry out his mission in the present. During a battle with the Justice Society Infinity of Earth-2, it is learned that his starfield suit was designed by three Brainiac 5s and is a map of the recreated multiverse.

The rest of the Justice Society of America arrive after learning from Sandman that Gog is rooting himself into the Earth, and they must kill him and separate his head from the planet. Gog's followers try to protect him, until they see him attack a Society member. He punishes them by removing his blessings, including Starman's sanity. The JSA remove Gog's head and Starman opens a stargate to the Source Wall, where Superman places the head. Superman asks Starman to return him to Earth-22.

In the Final Crisis: Legion of 3 Worlds miniseries, it is learned that Starman received his mysterious mission from Brainiac 5 during a 31st-century conflict between the Legion and the united forces of Superboy-Prime and the Legion of Super-Villains. Starman's mission was to exhume Superboy's body and place it in the regeneration chamber in the Fortress of Solitude used to restore Superman after his death. The healing process takes a millennium, and in the 31st century (at the peak of the battle) Superboy is reborn to join the fight. Starman does not return to the 31st century at the end of the series; he remains in the 21st century to carry out "a dead man's last wish", and an interlac document reading "Last Will and Testament of R. J. Brande" is visible. In Adventure Comics (volume 2) #8, Starman is part of a secret Legion team sent by the late R.J. Brande to the 21st century to save the future in the "Last Stand of New Krypton" storyline.

The New 52
Kallor reappears on the Legion roster after the Flashpoint reality-altering event, although he is inexplicably paraplegic. He later leaves the team to rescue Dream Girl from the Dominators after she and Brainiac 5 are kidnapped. Although Star Boy dies when the Legion headquarters collapses during the Fatal Five's onslaught, he is resurrected before the Inifinitus Saga in Justice League United.

In the "Watchmen" sequel "Doomsday Clock", Star Boy is among the Legion members who appear in the present after Doctor Manhattan undid the experiment that erased the Legion of Super-Heroes and the Justice Society of America.

Powers and abilities
In the first two incarnations of the Legion, Thom can temporarily increase the mass and density of any object or person. The version of Thom working with the Justice Society of America can travel between alternate universes using a combination of his mass-controlling powers and his uniform, a map of the multiverse created by three Brainiac 5s.

Equipment
As a member of the Legion of Super-Heroes, Thom has a Legion Flight Ring allowing him to fly and (in the "Threeboot" incarnation of the series) protecting him from space and other dangerous environments.

In other media
 Thom Kallor as Star Boy makes background appearances in Legion of Super Heroes, voiced by Bumper Robinson.
 Thomas Kallor / Star Boy appears in Justice League vs. the Fatal Five, voiced by Elyes Gabel. This version suffers from a form of schizophrenia and takes medication despite it no longer working. After accidentally traveling back in time to the 21st century while trying to stop the Fatal Five, he loses his medication and most of his memories, becoming more erratic due to his future medication not existing yet. He is incarcerated in Arkham Asylum, but uses his powers to escape after seeing the Fatal Five on the news, which triggers some of his memories. He later encounters the Justice League and Jessica Cruz, the latter of whom he forms a strong friendship with due in part to her own mental illness, before sacrificing himself to save Earth's sun from the Emerald Empress.

References

External links
 Pre-Zero Hour Star Boy Biography
 A Hero History of Star Boy

DC Comics metahumans
DC Comics aliens
DC Comics extraterrestrial superheroes
Comics characters introduced in 1961
Characters created by Otto Binder
Characters created by George Papp
Fictional characters with density control abilities 
Fictional characters with gravity abilities
Starman (DC Comics)